Paul Nieder-Westermann (3 October 1892, Langendreer – 10 October 1957, Bochum) was a German politician of the NSDAP.

Early years
After he completed the adult education center in Langendreer he began to study at the agrarian high school Hohenheim in Stuttgart. From 1916 to 1918, he took part on the Western front in the First World War.

Rise
On 1 April 1933, Nieder-Westermann was appointed to the leader from the upper relay Westfalen (South) of the NSKK. Finally he became Upper Group Leader on the NSKK in year 1943. Nieder-Westermann was elected as a representative for constituency 18 (Westfalen) to the Reichstag in 1936 and 1938. He also served as a judge in the People's Court.

References

1892 births
1957 deaths
National Socialist Motor Corps members
German Army personnel of World War I
Members of the Reichstag of Nazi Germany
Military personnel from Bochum
People from the Province of Westphalia